Lukiano is a hamlet and concejo located in the municipality of Zuia, in Álava province, Basque Country, Spain. As of 2020, it has a population of 42.

Geography 
Lukiano is located 24km northwest of Vitoria-Gasteiz.

References

Populated places in Álava